In statistics, a location parameter of a probability distribution is a scalar- or vector-valued parameter , which determines the "location" or shift of the distribution. In the literature of location parameter estimation, the probability distributions with such parameter are found to be formally defined in one of the following equivalent ways:
 either as having a probability density function or probability mass function ; or
 having a cumulative distribution function ; or
 being defined as resulting from the random variable transformation , where  is a random variable with a certain, possibly unknown, distribution (See also #Additive_noise).

A direct example of a location parameter is the parameter  of the normal distribution. To see this, note that the probability density function  of a normal distribution  can have the parameter  factored out and be written as: 

thus fulfilling the first of the definitions given above.

The above definition indicates, in the one-dimensional case, that if  is increased, the probability density or mass function shifts rigidly to the right, maintaining its exact shape.

A location parameter can also be found in families having more than one parameter, such as location–scale families. In this case, the probability density function or probability mass function will be a special case of the more general form

Definition
Let  be any probability density function and let  and  be any given constants. Then the function

is a probability density function.

The location family is then defined as follows:

Let  be any probability density function. Then the family of probability density functions  is called the location family with standard probability density function , where  is called the location parameter for the family.

Additive noise
An alternative way of thinking of location families is through the concept of additive noise. If  is a constant and W is random noise with probability density  then  has probability density  and its distribution is therefore part of a location family.

Proofs

For the continuous univariate case, consider a probability density function , where  is a vector of parameters. A location parameter  can be added by defining:

now making the variable change  and updating the integration interval accordingly yields:

See also
 Central tendency
 Location test
 Invariant estimator
 Scale parameter
 Two-moment decision models

References

Summary statistics
Statistical parameters